A dry lake is an ephemeral lakebed.

Dry Lake may also refer to:

Dry Lake (Churchill County, Nevada)
Dry Lake (Esmeralda County, Nevada)
Dry Lake (Codington County, South Dakota)
Dry Lake (Hamlin County, South Dakota)